Muhler is a surname. Notable people with the surname include:

Joseph C. Muhler (1923–1996), American biochemist and dentist
Marie Sheehan Muhler (born 1937), American politician

See also 
Miller (surname)
Muller

Occupational surnames
German-language surnames